Nuluk River (alternate Nooluk River) is a waterway on the Seward Peninsula in the U.S. state of Alaska. It heads in the high mountains made up of the Port Clarence limestone about 35 miles south of the Arctic Ocean. Fossils have been reported about the head of the river. Northward along its course, the character of the bed rock changes, and calcareous mica-schists are noted. The Silurian limestones dip toward the schists, and near the contact with them, are very highly folded. The coastal plain gravel extends inland farther along the Nuluk River than it does on the other rivers of this region.

References

Bibliography

Rivers of the Seward Peninsula
Rivers of Alaska
Rivers of Nome Census Area, Alaska
Rivers of Unorganized Borough, Alaska